Bellbrook is a city in Greene County, Ohio, United States. The population was 7,317 at the 2020 census. It is part of the Dayton Metropolitan Statistical Area.

History
Bellbrook was laid out in 1816.  The name Bellbrook is an amalgamation of the name one of the city's founders, Stephen Bell, and Little Sugar Creek. A post office called Bell Brook was established in 1817, and the name was changed to Bellbrook in 1895.

Initially a village, Bellbrook grew by way of annexation of territory from surrounding Sugarcreek Township.  The first annexation, in 1970, helped push the population over 5,000 and led to Bellbrook achieving city status in 1974.  With large amounts of build-able land, the area added over 1,000 housing units since the annexation. Today the city is largely developed with little land left for future development. Most of the development is taking place in neighboring Sugarcreek Twp.

Geography

Demographics

2010 census
As of the census of 2010, there were 6,943 people, 2,767 households, and 2,068 families living in the city. The racial makeup of the city was 96.0% White, 1.3% African American, 0.3% Native American, 0.7% Asian, 0.4% from other races, and 1.3% from two or more races. Hispanic or Latino of any race were 2.1% of the population.

There were 2,767 households, of which 33.2% had children under the age of 18 living with them, 62.4% were married couples living together, 8.5% had a female householder with no husband present, 3.8% had a male householder with no wife present, and 25.3% were non-families. 21.6% of all households were made up of individuals, and 7.5% had someone living alone who was 65 years of age or older. The average household size was 2.51 and the average family size was 2.93.

The median age in the city was 42.5 years. 23.9% of residents were under the age of 18; 6.1% were between the ages of 18 and 24; 23.8% were from 25 to 44; 33.2% were from 45 to 64; and 12.9% were 65 years of age or older. The gender makeup of the city was 49.4% male and 50.6% female.

2000 census
As of the census of 2000, there were 7,009 people, 2,222 households, and 2,022 families living in the city. The population density was 2,244.4 people per square mile (867.4/km2). There were 3,120 housing units at an average density of 861.1/sq mi (332.8/km2). The racial makeup of the city was 97.19% White, 0.78% African American, 0.30% Native American, 0.98% Asian, 0.03% Pacific Islander, 0.11% from other races, and 0.60% from two or more races. Hispanic or Latino of any race were 1.20% of the population.

There were 2,596 households, out of which 39.8% had children under the age of 18 living with them, 68.0% were married couples living together, 7.0% had a female householder with no husband present, and 22.1% were non-families. 18.8% of all households were made up of individuals, and 5.9% had someone living alone who was 65 years of age or older. The average household size was 2.70 and the average family size was 3.11.

In the city the population was spread out, with 28.0% under the age of 18, 6.6% from 18 to 24, 31.4% from 25 to 44, 24.7% from 45 to 64, and 9.2% who were 65 years of age or older. The median age was 37 years. For every 100 females, there were 97.9 males. For every 100 females age 18 and over, there were 95.9 males.

The median income for a household in the city was $62,794, and the median income for a family was $69,770. Males had a median income of $51,311 versus $35,184 for females. The per capita income for the city was $26,183. About 1.7% of families and 2.3% of the population were below the poverty line, including 2.8% of those under age 18 and 4.5% of those age 65 or over.

Arts and culture

The city holds a Sugar Maple Festival every April and a Lions Club Festival every August.

Bellbrook has a public library, a branch of the Greene County Public Library.

The Bellbrook Historical Museum, locate at 42 North Main Street, offers a collection of history from information and objects dating back over the past several hundred years.

Government
Bellbrook is governed by a council-manager form of administration.  The city manager is appointed by a council, while the council is elected for four-year terms, and the mayor for two-year terms,  in non-partisan elections.

Education 
Bellbrook has five school buildings:
 Stephen Bell Elementary, grades K–2
 Bell Creek Intermediate, grades 3–5
 Bellbrook Middle School, grades 6–8
 Bellbrook High School, grades 9–12
 Sugarcreek Education Center, alternate education

Notable people
 Connor Stephen Betts, perpetrator of the 2019 Dayton shooting.
Erma Bombeck, writer.
Austin Spitler, NFL player
Jonathan Winters, actor and comedian

References

External links
 City website

Cities in Ohio
Cities in Greene County, Ohio
Populated places established in 1816
1816 establishments in Ohio